Belek is a town in Serik district of Antalya Province, Turkey.

Belek may also refer to:

Bełek, a village in Grójec County, Masovian Voivodeship, east-central Poland
Belek Ghazi, 12th-century Turkic bey